Moorestown is an unincorporated community in Spice Valley Township, Lawrence County, Indiana.

Geography

References

Unincorporated communities in Lawrence County, Indiana
Unincorporated communities in Indiana